Prochoreutis chionocosma is a moth in the family Choreutidae. It was described by Alexey Diakonoff in 1978. It is found in Afghanistan.

References

Natural History Museum Lepidoptera generic names catalog

Prochoreutis
Moths described in 1978